"The Water Cure" is a 1916 American silent comedy film featuring Oliver Hardy.

The Water Cure may also refer to:

Books
 The Water Cure, a 2007 novel by Percival Everett
 The Water Cure, a 2018 novel by Sophie Mackintosh
 The Water Cure in Chronic Disease, a 1846 book by James Manby Gully

Other uses
 The Water-Cure, a 1991 play by Carey Harrison
 The Water-Cure Journal, a journal created by Joel Shew
 "The Water Cure", a song by Systematic from their 2003 album Pleasure to Burn

See also
 Water cure